The 1973–74 Minnesota Golden Gophers men's ice hockey season was the 53rd season of play for the program, the 16th in the Big Ten and 15th in the WCHA. The Golden Gophers represented the University of Minnesota and were coached by Herb Brooks in his 2nd season. The Golden Gophers defeated Michigan Tech 4–2 in the NCAA championship game to win the program's first national championship.

Season

Stumbling Out of the Gate
After a poor year in his first season as head coach, hopes were high for Herb Brooks in year two. In 1973 the NCAA had finally cracked down on teams importing over-aged players from Canada and had gone so far as to vacate Denver's participation in the national tournament. While the majority of Canadian players who were already on NCAA teams were grandfathered into the new policy and allowed to play, no incoming players were permitted if they had played in any top-tier Canadian Junior League. Because Minnesota's team had been almost exclusively made up of native players for the past two decades the result of the renewed enforcement gave the Golden Gophers an advantage; because they had been actively recruiting players from Minnesota they were the primary destination for the best players in the state. However, because many NCAA teams were still made up of a majority of Canadians this advantage would not yet be realized.

Regardless of the recruiting practices, Minnesota went into the season looking to recover from a losing season and returned many players from the previous year. Senior netminder Brad Shelstad was named team captain and led the Golden Gophers against an improving Minnesota–Duluth squad in their season opener on the road. Minnesota dropped the contest 3–4 and then headed home to host defending national champion Wisconsin and dropped to 0–3 on the season after losing both games. The Gophers then welcomed another Big Ten rival in Michigan and ended the weekend with an 0–4–1 record.

Recovery
This was a disaster for the Gophers, who were looking for more out of the young coach, but the next team up for Minnesota was North Dakota, who were in the midst of their second worst season since World War II. The Golden Gophers dominated UND, outscoring the Fighting Sioux 18–6 in the two games. The following weekend Minnesota hit the road and played Michigan State. While the series was closer in score Minnesota once again won both games and pulled their record back to even. The golden Gophers returned home and played their first non-conference games of the season, taking another set of close matches against rising Saint Louis. After a week off Minnesota–Duluth arrived in Minneapolis and the Gophers were able to just finish ahead of the Bulldogs, tying the first game before winning the second.

At the end of December Minnesota played in the St. Louis Holiday Tournament. After opening with a win over Harvard, Minnesota faced the Billikens for the third time that season who were able to repay the Gophers with their 6–2 victory, leaving Minnesota as the runner-up. A day after the final Minnesota played the Czech National Team and through they lost the game 1–7 the contest was an exhibition match and did not count towards their record.

.500 Hockey
Minnesota began the second half of their regular season at North Dakota, taking both games to improve to 10–5–2 in the WCHA despite being held to two goals in both games. The Gophers continued their road swing against Minnesota–Duluth and lost both games, a trend that would mostly continue for the next month. After splitting two consecutive series Minnesota faced Wisconsin in mid-February with the Big Ten championship up for grabs. Despite the Gophers' bad start Wisconsin had faltered down the stretch and the two were now tied for the lead. The teams ended up tying both games to finish with identical 5–4–3 records.

With only WCHA games left on their schedule Minnesota had plenty of opportunity to finish atop the conference standings but they would need help. On February 14, Minnesota was behind Denver and Michigan Tech with Wisconsin trailing by one point. The Gophers, however, had an advantage in that they still had six conference games to play while Wisconsin had four and Denver had two. Michigan Tech was far in the lead with a 15–5–2 record and six WCHA games to play, but because the conference tournament would crown two co-champions Minnesota could ensure home ice so long as they finished in the top two spots.

Minnesota's played two series against bottom-feeding teams in Notre Dame and Colorado College, winning three games and tying the other. The seven points put Minnesota firmly in the 2nd spot with 33 points while Michigan Tech being 5 points ahead ensured the Huskies with the Conference title. because the two teams could not meet in the WCHA tournament the regular season finale between the two would be the only meeting other than possibly for the national championship. With both team only playing for pride Michigan Tech used home ice to their advantage and easily defeated the Gophers, outscoring their opponents by 3 goals in each game. The poor end to the regular season, however would not put a damper on Minnesota's playoff hopes as they were set up to host each WCHA playoff round they could reach.

WCHA Tournament
Minnesota met Michigan in the opening round and got off to a good start in the first game, capturing the match 5–1. with a 4-goal advantage for the two-game aggregate series Minnesota had a comfortable lead but that did not stop them from winning the second contest, albeit with a much closer score. In the second round Minnesota welcomed Denver to Minneapolis. The Gopher's victory against the Pioneers in the regular season was their first since 1958 and Minnesota had to beat Denver once again if they wanted to make the NCAA tournament. The two heated rivals fought to a 3–3 tie in the first game leading to a decisive second game where Brad Shelstad held Denver to a single goal and gave Minnesota its third WCHA Tournament championship (shared with Michigan Tech).

NCAA tournament
The NCAA had altered its classification system in the summer of 1973 making the 1974 tournament the first official Division I championship. The renaming, however, meant nothing as far as any of the teams were concerned. The format and selection remained unchanged and, with their #2 western seed assured, Minnesota faced ECAC champion Boston University. The Terriers had knocked Minnesota out in its last tournament appearance but this time the Gophers were up for the challenge and eked out a narrow 5–4 win. The following night Michigan Tech won their game against Harvard in overtime to match the two WCHA teams in the final. While the Huskies had easily handles Minnesota two weeks earlier, the team had started to show cracks, tying once against the weak Notre Dame team and losing one of their games to Michigan State in the WCHA tournament. Even with the experienced John MacInnes at the helm Michigan Tech wasn't playing particularly well and Minnesota took advantage early. The Gophers outshot MTU 17–11 in the opening frame, with John Sheridan scoring the game's first goal in the 16th minute. John Perpich added a second marker early in the second but the two-goal lead seemed to wake up the Huskies who proved a much stiffer test in the middle period. George Lyle cut the lead in half and sent the match into the third with Minnesota clinging to a narrow margin. The Huskies, however, fell apart in the last 20 minutes, allowing Minnesota to outshoot them 14–3 and score twice more to gain a three-goal edge. High-scoring sophomore Mike Zuke netted MTU's second goal of the game but it came with less than a minute remaining and Minnesota won its first National Title.

Team Captain Brad Shelstad was named as the Tournament MOP and found himself on the All-Tournament Team along with teammates Les Auge and Mike Polich. Minnesota had none of its players make the AHCA All-American West Team while Shelstad was the only member of the Gophers to make an All-WCHA Team, earning first-team honors.

Minnesota had not been expected to compete for a national championship and even after the win Pat Phippen was at a loss for how to explain their surprise title. This was due in part to Minnesota being the first team since Boston College in 1949 to win a championship with a team made up of primarily American players and were one Eric Lockwood game away from playing an entire season with only native Minnesotans. The All-American team was one of the most important wins for USA Hockey as it demonstrated that American players could compete with Canadians and gave professional teams one more reason why they should give US players a chance. The win by Minnesota was felt in the 1974 NHL amateur draft when Minnesota went from have no players taken in either of the previous two years to eight alumni selected in 1974.

Standings

Schedule

|-
!colspan=12 style="color:white; background:#862334; " | Regular Season

|-
!colspan=12 style="color:white; background:#862334; " | 

|-
!colspan=12 style="color:white; background:#862334; " | 

|- align="center" bgcolor="#e0e0e0"
|colspan=12|Minnesota Wins Series 10-5

|- align="center" bgcolor="#e0e0e0"
|colspan=12|Minnesota Wins Series 5-4
|-
!colspan=12 style="color:white; background:#862334; " |

Roster and scoring statistics

Goaltending statistics

1974 championship game

(W1) Michigan Tech vs. (W2) Minnesota

Players drafted into the NHL/WHA

1974 NHL amateur draft

1974 WHA Amateur Draft

† Incoming Freshman.‡ Sundberg played for Minnesota in 1972–73.

References

Minnesota Golden Gophers men's ice hockey seasons
Minnesota
Minnesota
Minnesota
Minnesota
Minnesota
Minnesota